Francisco Alberto Escudero Casquino (born 9 July 1966) is a Peruvian politician and a former Congressman representing La Libertad for the 2006–2011 term. Escudero belongs to the Union for Peru party. He failed to attain re-election in the 2011 elections when he ran for re-election under the National Solidarity Alliance of Luis Castañeda, but he attained a low share of votes and was not returned to Congress.

External links

Official Congressional Site

1966 births
Living people
Union for Peru politicians
Members of the Congress of the Republic of Peru
People from La Libertad Region